Ross Aden Jenkins (born 9 November 1990) is an English former professional footballer who played as a central midfielder. He is currently head coach of National League South club Oxford City.

Jenkins is the second player with his name to have played competitive football for Watford. He is no relation to the Ross Jenkins who played for Watford from 1972 to 1983, and was a two-time Watford Player of the Season.

Career
Jenkins was born in Watford and began a two-year academy scholarship with Watford in summer 2007. During the 2007–08 season he played regularly in the club's under-18 side, as well as appearing for the reserves. After appearing frequently for Watford's first team during the 2008 pre-season, he made his competitive debut on 12 August 2008 whilst still an academy scholar. Jenkins played the entire game as Watford beat League One side Bristol Rovers 1–0 in the League Cup. He remained in the club's League Cup team, playing full games against Darlington, West Ham United and Swansea City before Watford bowed out to Tottenham Hotspur in the quarter-final.

Jenkins made his league debut in the defeat at Barnsley on 15 November 2008 under the management of Malky Mackay, and retained his place in the team thereafter, scoring his first league goal in the 3–2 defeat at promotion contenders Birmingham City on 6 December. In 2009, Jenkins formed a midfield partnership with Jack Cork under manager Brendan Rodgers in which the team climbed to 13th place in the league by the end of the season. He made his 50th start for Watford on 20 October 2009 against Ipswich Town.

Jenkins then went on to represent England at U20 level, playing at the Hawthornes against Montenegro beating them 5–0.

Jenkins signed for Plymouth Argyle on an initial one-month loan on 21 September. He scored on his debut in League Two as the club came from two goals behind to win 3–2 at Morecambe. After scoring his first goal, Jenkins said he determined to expect to score more goals at Plymouth. However, Jenkins time at Plymouth Argyle was short-lived and return to his parent club after suffering a groin injury Jenkins joined Barnet on loan in March 2013, and made his debut when he played 90 minutes in a 4–1 home win over Morecambe. He scored his first goal for Barnet in a 3–2 defeat at Accrington Stanley on 16 March 2013. Jenkins made 5 appearances in total before returning to Watford.

After leaving Watford, Jenkins started training with Malky Mackay's Wigan Athletic at the beginning of the 2014/15 season. On 17 September 2015, he joined Crawley Town,

In January 2016, less than four months after joining Crawley, Jenkins' cancelled his contract and he moved to Romania to join Poli Timișoara.

In February 2017, Jenkins joined Bulgarian club Pirin Blagoevgrad, signing a 6-month contract. He left the club after his contract expired.

On 2 August 2017, Jenkins signed with Norwegian Eliteserien side Viking. He was released by Viking at the end of the 2017 Norwegian season, and signed for Scottish Premiership club Hamilton Academical in February 2018.

Coaching career
Persistent injury led Jenkins to retire from professional football at the age of 28; he subsequently moved into a coaching role at non-league side Oxford City.

Following the departure of first-team manager David Oldfield to Weymouth in January 2022, Jenkins was placed in caretaker charge with the club sitting in fourth position in the table. On 9 March, Jenkins was appointed Head Coach on a permanent contract.

International career
Jenkins received his first call up to the England U20 squad on 7 August 2009. He started in their friendly against Montenegro a few days later at The Hawthorns which ended in a 5–0 victory.

Career statistics

Club

References

External links

 Ross Jenkins Interview

1990 births
Living people
Footballers from Hertfordshire
Sportspeople from Watford
English footballers
Association football midfielders
Watford F.C. players
Plymouth Argyle F.C. players
Barnet F.C. players
Crawley Town F.C. players
ACS Poli Timișoara players
OFC Pirin Blagoevgrad players
Viking FK players
Hamilton Academical F.C. players
English Football League players
Liga I players
First Professional Football League (Bulgaria) players
Eliteserien players
Scottish Professional Football League players
England youth international footballers
English expatriate footballers
English expatriate sportspeople in Romania
English expatriate sportspeople in Bulgaria
English expatriate sportspeople in Norway
Expatriate footballers in Romania
Expatriate footballers in Bulgaria
Expatriate footballers in Norway
English football managers
Oxford City F.C. managers
National League (English football) managers
Association football coaches